The Munfordville Presbyterian Church and Green River Lodge No. 88 is a historic church and former Masonic lodge building, located at 3rd and Washington Streets in Munfordville, Kentucky.

It was built in 1835 and added to the National Register of Historic Places in 1980.

The church was organized in 1829 by the Reverend John Howe.  It was the first church in Munfordville.

As originally constructed, the building contained a meeting hall for Green River Lodge No. 88 on its upper floor, and the lodge group was still meeting there in 1977.

References

Presbyterian churches in Kentucky
Churches on the National Register of Historic Places in Kentucky
National Register of Historic Places in Hart County, Kentucky
Masonic buildings in Kentucky
Clubhouses on the National Register of Historic Places in Kentucky
1835 establishments in Kentucky
Cultural infrastructure completed in 1835
Churches completed in 1835